Clarence Woodrow Jones (born November 7, 1940) is a former professional baseball player. He played from  through  for the Chicago Cubs. Listed at 6' 2", 185 lb., Jones batted and threw left-handed. He was born in Birmingham, Alabama

Career
In a two-season career, Jones was a .248 hitter (34-for-137) with two home runs and 16 RBI in 58 games, including 13 runs and seven doubles.

Following his majors career, Jones played in Japan for the Kintetsu Buffaloes of the Pacific League. In 1974, he hit 38 home runs to lead the league, becoming the first foreign player to win a home run title in Nippon Professional Baseball. He led the Pacific League again with 36 home runs in 1976.

He is the father of actor Richard T. Jones, and Clarence Jones Jr., a high school basketball coach.

See also
1966 Chicago Cubs season
1967 Chicago Cubs season
1974 in baseball
Chicago Cubs all-time roster

References

External links

Baseball Gauge
Retrosheet
Venezuelan Professional Baseball League

1940 births
Living people
African-American baseball coaches
African-American baseball players
Albuquerque Dodgers players
Albuquerque Dukes players
American expatriate baseball players in Japan
American expatriate baseball players in Mexico
Arizona Instructional League Cubs players
Arizona Instructional League Dodgers players
Artesia Dodgers players
Atlanta Braves coaches
Baseball coaches from Alabama
Baseball players from Birmingham, Alabama
Chicago Cubs players
Cleveland Indians coaches
Dallas–Fort Worth Spurs players
Great Falls Electrics players
Indianapolis Indians players
Johnson City Phillies players
Kintetsu Buffaloes players
Kokomo Dodgers players
Leones del Caracas players
American expatriate baseball players in Venezuela
Major League Baseball first basemen
Major League Baseball hitting coaches
Major League Baseball right fielders
Mexican League baseball players
Nankai Hawks players
Nippon Professional Baseball first basemen
Nippon Professional Baseball outfielders
Rieleros de Aguascalientes players
Salem Dodgers players
Santa Barbara Rancheros players
Tacoma Cubs players
21st-century African-American people
20th-century African-American sportspeople